The 2004 Men's European Volleyball League was the first edition of the European Volleyball League, organised by Europe's governing volleyball body, the CEV. The final Four was held in Opava, Czech Republic from 10 to 11 July 2004.

Competing nations

Squads

League round

Pool 1

|}

Leg 1

Leg 2

Leg 3

Leg 4

Leg 5

Leg 6

Pool 2

|}

Leg 1

Leg 2

Leg 3

Leg 4

Leg 5

Leg 6

Final four

Semi-finals

3rd place match

Final

Final standing

Awards

Most Valuable Player
  Petr Pláteník
Best Scorer
  Igor Omrčen
Best Spiker
  Martin Lébl
Best Blocker
  Mike van de Goor
Best Server
  Björn Andrae

European Volleyball League
E
V
V